The women's points race at the 2007 Dutch National Track Championships in Alkmaar took place at Sportpaleis Alkmaar from December 29, to December 30, 2007.

Competition format
The competition started with a qualification round. The best riders of each two heats on December 29 qualified for the final match on December 30.

Final results (top 10)

Final results

References

2007 Dutch National track cycling championships
Dutch National Track Championships – Women's points race